The 1950 U.S. Women's Open was the fifth U.S. Women's Open, held September 28 to October 1 at Rolling Hills Country Club in Wichita, Kansas.

Babe Zaharias won the second of her three U.S. Women's Open titles, nine strokes ahead of runner-up Betsy Rawls, an amateur. Defending champion Louise Suggs finished in solo third. Zaharias entered the final round with a four stroke lead over Rawls. It was the seventh of ten major championships for Zaharias, and Rawls won the title the following year.

The formation of the LPGA was announced during this championship, which was not run by the United States Golf Association (USGA) until 1953. The U.S. Women's Open returned to Wichita five years later in 1955 at Wichita Country Club.

Past champions in the field

Final leaderboard
Sunday, October 1, 1950

Source:

References

External links
USGA final leaderboard
U.S. Women's Open Golf Championship
U.S. Women's Open – past champions – 1950

U.S. Women's Open
Golf in Kansas
Sports competitions in Wichita, Kansas
U.S. Women's Open
U.S. Women's Open
U.S. Women's Open
U.S. Women's Open
U.S. Women's Open
Women's sports in Kansas